Massimo Barbuti (born 5 August 1958) is an Italian former football player and manager born in San Giuliano Terme. He made 23 appearances in Serie A (for Ascoli), 67 in Serie B (for Parma and Ascoli), and a further 226 in the lower professional divisions. Barbuti has said his most memorable moments came when he played for Parma, with whose fans he enjoyed a great rapport.

References

1958 births
Living people
Italian footballers
Association football forwards
Spezia Calcio players
Taranto F.C. 1927 players
Parma Calcio 1913 players
Ascoli Calcio 1898 F.C. players
Calcio Foggia 1920 players
F.C. Esperia Viareggio players
Treviso F.B.C. 1993 players
Serie D players
Serie C players
Serie B players
Serie A players
Italian football managers